The FIL World Luge Championships 2013 took place under the auspices of the International Luge Federation at the bobsleigh, luge, and skeleton track in Whistler, British Columbia, Canada. The facility was chosen at the 57th FIL Congress in Liberec, Czech Republic on 20 June 2009. Whistler was the only venue bidding for the championships.

Medalists

Medal table

Results

Men's singles

Doubles

Women's singles

Team relay

References

FIL World Luge Championships
2013 in luge
2013 in Canadian sports
International luge competitions hosted by Canada